is a passenger railway station located in Kawasaki-ku, Kawasaki, Kanagawa Prefecture, Japan, operated by the private railway operator Keikyū.

Lines
Kojimashinden Station is served by the Keikyū Daishi Line and is located 4.5 kilometers from the opposing terminus of the line at Keikyū Kawasaki  Station.

Station layout
The station consists of a single island platform serving two terminus tracks.

Platforms

History
Kojimashinden Station opened on 1 October 1944 under the Tokyu Corporation. Keihin Electric Express Railway took over the station from 1 June 1948 after it was spun off from Tokyu.

On 25 March 1964 it became the terminal of the Daishi Line when Shiohama Station was closed. At that time, the station was moved 300m west, and its platform arrangement was changed from double tracked side platforms to a single track terminus.

The station was converted into a double track island platform on 14 March 2010.

Keikyū introduced station numbering to its stations on 21 October 2010; Kojimashinden Station was assigned station number KK26.

Passenger statistics
In fiscal 2019, the station was used by an average of 22,743 passengers daily. 

The passenger figures for previous years are as shown below.

Surrounding area
 Kawasaki City Tonomachi Elementary School
 AOI International Hospital
 Kawasaki Freight Station-Tokaido Freight Branch Line, Kanagawa Seaside Railway Mizue Line, Chidori Line, Ukishima Line
 Nippon Yakin Kogyo Kawasaki Factory (formerly YAKIN Kawasaki)

See also
 List of railway stations in Japan

References

External links

 

Railway stations in Kanagawa Prefecture
Railway stations in Japan opened in 1944
Railway stations in Kawasaki, Kanagawa
Keikyū Daishi Line